Fortean TV was a British paranormal documentary television series that originally aired from  to  on Channel 4. Produced by Rapido TV, the program features anomalous phenomena and the paranormal. It was based upon the Fortean Times magazine and was presented by Reverend Lionel Fanthorpe. Fortean TV ran for 3 series (the third was an adult version renamed Fortean TV Uncut with unseen material from the previous two series as well as new items).  The three seasons comprised: 22 half-hour episodes (the last of the first season was a compilation "Best Of"), plus a final hour-long family Christmas special.

Series 1 contained 9 unique episodes, broadcast on Wednesday evenings (29 January – 26 March 1997), with a final tenth "Best Of" the following week to round off the season (Wednesday, 2 April 1997).

Series 2 contained 8 unique episodes, beginning again the following January, broadcast now on Friday evenings (16 January – 6 March 1998).

Fortean TV Uncut – a short four-episode adult spin-off series with unseen material from the previous two series as well as new items – immediately followed (beginning less than a week after the second series had finished), now back on Wednesday evenings (11 March – 1 April 1998).

The show concluded with a Christmas Special at the end of that year entitled Xmas Files (Saturday 19 December 1998).

The show's theme tune was Danny's Inferno by The Three Suns.

The entire show was released on DVD in the UK in 2021.

References

External links
 

Channel 4 documentary series
Forteana
Paranormal television
British supernatural television shows
1990s British documentary television series
1997 British television series debuts
1998 British television series endings
English-language television shows